Three ships of the United States Navy have been USS John Rodgers for John Rodgers, his son, John Rodgers and his great grandson, John Rodgers.

, was a lighthouse tender and part of the Lighthouse Service run by the Navy from 1917 to 1919

See also

United States Navy ship names